HMCS Yellowknife is a  that has served in the Canadian Forces since 1998. Yellowknife is the seventh ship of her class. She is the first vessel to use the designation Yellowknife in the Royal Canadian Navy. The coastal defence vessel is assigned to Maritime Forces Pacific (MARPAC) and is homeported at CFB Esquimalt.

Design and description
The Kingston class was designed to fill the minesweeper, coastal patrol and reserve training needs of the Canadian Forces, replacing the s, s and Royal Canadian Mounted Police coastal launches in those roles. In order to perform these varied duties the Kingston-class vessels are designed to carry up to three  ISO containers with power hookups on the open deck aft in order to embark mission-specific payloads. The seven module types available for embarkation include four route survey, two mechanical minesweeping and one bottom inspection modules.

The coastal defence vessels are powered by four Jeumont ANR-53-50 alternators coupled to four Wärtsilä UD 23V12 diesel engines creating . Two LIPS Z-drive azimuth thrusters are driven by two Jeumont CI 560L motors creating  and the Z drives can be rotated 360°.

The Kingston class is equipped with a Kelvin Hughes navigational radar using the I band and a Kelvin Hughes 6000 surface search radar scanning the E and F bands. The vessels carry an AN/SQS-511 towed side scan sonar for minesweeping and a Remote-control Mine Hunting System (RMHS). The vessels are equipped with one Bofors 40 mm/60 calibre Mk 5C gun and two M2 machine guns. The 40 mm gun was declared obsolete and removed from the vessels in 2014. Some of them ended up as museum pieces and on display at naval reserve installations across Canada. The Kingston-class coastal defence vessels have a complement of 37.

Service history
Yellowknife keel was laid down on 7 November 1996 by Halifax Shipyards Ltd. at Halifax, Nova Scotia and was launched on 5 June 1997. The coastal defence vessel transferred to the west coast in January 1998 and was commissioned into the Canadian Forces on 18 April 1998 at Esquimalt, British Columbia and carries the hull number MM 706. On 4 June 1999, the vessel collided with another minesweeper during operations off Victoria, British Columbia while trying to avoid floating obstacles. On 18 June 1999 the vessel was given freedom of the city of Yellowknife, Northwest Territories.

Following those exercises, Yellowknife and Brandon deployed as part of Operation Caribbe, completing their tour on 4 December. In June 2016, Calgary,  and Yellowknife sailed from Esquimalt to participate in the RIMPAC naval exercise. After reports surfaced of a lost nuclear bomb was discovered off the coast of British Columbia, Yellowknife was sent to investigate and recover the item. Divers from Yellowknife determined the object was not the missing bomb. From August to September 2017, Yellowknife and sister ship  sailed to the Arctic Ocean to perform surveillance of Canada's northern waters as part of Operation Limpid. They returned to Esquimalt on 5 October.

In June and July 2018, Yellowknife and sister ship  were deployed off the coast of Southern California while taking part in RIMPAC 2018. Whitehorse and Yellowknife both deployed to the Pacific as part of Operation Caribbe on 15 March 2019.

References

Notes

Citations

Sources

External links
 HMCS Yellowknife (MM 706) – official website

Fleet of the Royal Canadian Navy
Kingston-class coastal defence vessels
1997 ships
Ships built in Nova Scotia